The Dubai Champions Cup (originally called the Dubai Super Cup) was an annual association football match contested between the champions of the English and Scottish leagues. The competition took place for three consecutive seasons from 1986–87 to 1988–89 in the United Arab Emirates port of Dubai, during the time when English football clubs were banned from taking part in UEFA club competitions as a result of the Heysel Stadium disaster in 1985.

History
The first match took place on 9 December 1986 at the Al Wasl Stadium between English champions Liverpool and Scottish champions Celtic. The match finished 1–1, with Liverpool winning 4–2 on a penalty shoot-out.

English champions Everton and Scottish champions Rangers played the match the following year in December 1987. Rangers came from two goals behind to level the match after 90 minutes at 2–2. This was despite referee Keith Cooper disallowing six goals for the Ibrox club during the game. Rangers went on to win 8–7 on penalty kicks.

The final match took place on 4 April 1989 at the Al-Nasar Stadium.  The competition was now renamed the Dubai Champions Cup and featured the same sides that took part in 1986; Liverpool and Celtic. Once again the match finished level after 90 minutes, 1–1; this time Celtic won 4–2 on penalty kicks.

1986–87

1987–88

1988–89

References

Recurring sporting events established in 1986
1986 establishments in the United Arab Emirates
1986–87 in English football
1987–88 in English football
1988–89 in English football
1986–87 in Scottish football
1987–88 in Scottish football
1988–89 in Scottish football
Recurring events disestablished in 1989
1989 disestablishments in Asia
Emirati football friendly trophies
1980s in the United Arab Emirates
International club association football competitions hosted by the United Arab Emirates